Ezra Convis ( –1838) was the first speaker of the Michigan House of Representatives and the founder of Verona, Michigan.

Convis was a native of Silver Creek, Chautauqua County, New York.  He moved to Michigan in 1834 settling first at Battle Creek and then moving north in 1835 to found the town of Verona.  In 1835 he was elected to the new Michigan House of Representatives and was chosen as the first speaker of the house.  Convis was re-elected in 1837 but died in early 1838 as a result of a sleigh accident that occurred while he was returning to Detroit (then the capital of Michigan) from attending the wedding of a daughter of Mr. Ten Eyck in Dearborn.

Convis was a Jacksonian Democrat.

Sources

History of Calhoun County, Michigan p. 313-314

1838 deaths
Speakers of the Michigan House of Representatives
People from Silver Creek, New York
Year of birth missing
People from Calhoun County, Michigan
Members of the Michigan House of Representatives
American city founders
Michigan Jacksonians
Road incident deaths in Michigan
19th-century American politicians